Ross James Sykes (born 26 March 1999) is an English professional footballer who plays as a defender for Belgian First Division A club Union SG.

Career
Sykes was born in Burnley, Lancashire and attended Unity College in the town. He started his career with local side Burnley, playing for their youth team between the ages of eleven and thirteen before being released. After nearly giving up the game he was persuaded to go on trial at Accrington Stanley by his mother and was later signed up by the club. In May 2016, he signed his first professional contract on a two-year deal, despite being a first-year scholar. He made his senior debut for the club in August 2016, starting in the 3–0 defeat to Crewe Alexandra in  EFL Trophy group-stage. Accrington exercised a contractual option at the end of the 2017–18 season to retain him.

On 23 June 2022, Sykes joined Belgian First Division A side Union SG for an undisclosed fee.

Career statistics

References

External links
Ross Sykes at the Accrington Stanley F.C. website

1998 births
Living people
Footballers from Burnley
English footballers
Association football defenders
Accrington Stanley F.C. players
Southport F.C. players
Royale Union Saint-Gilloise players
English Football League players
National League (English football) players
English expatriate footballers
Expatriate footballers in Belgium
English expatriate sportspeople in Belgium